Angelique Rockas is an actress, producer and activist. Rockas founded the theatre company Internationalist Theatre in the UK with her patron Athol Fugard. The theatre featured multi-racial casts in classical plays.

Early life
Rockas was born and raised in Boksburg, South Africa, to Greek parents who had emigrated from Greece with hopes of finding a better life. She had three siblings, followed Greek Orthodox Christian traditions, and was taught to honour her Greek cultural heritage. She received her early education at St Dominic's Catholic School for Girls, Boksburg, and later earned a bachelor's degree in English literature with a major in philosophy at the University of the Witwatersrand in Johannesburg. After earning her degree, Rockas went on to complete an acting course at the Drama School of the University of Cape Town under the direction of Robert Mohr.

A young activist, Rockas appeared on the June 1970 front page of the Star with a group of debutantes raising funds for Saheti School, a Greek school located in Germiston, South Africa. She also participated in a 25 March Greek War of Independence Poetry Celebration with George Bizos. Bizos nicknamed her "l'enfant terrible" for her resistance to the status quo, and became her role model leading up to her founding of the Internationalist Theatre.

Her activities as an anti-apartheid and feminist activist in “the then underdeveloped and extremely conservative” South Africa eventually motivated her move to the UK.  While residing in North London, she worked for Theatro Technis, a Greek Cypriot theatre company that focused on sociopolitical issues affecting Greek Cypriots, and also helped to promote Greek tragedies and comedies to London audiences.

Acting career
In London, Rockas began acting under the direction of George Eugeniou at Theatro Technis where she participated in Greek classical productions.

Rockas also played Io in a production of Prometheus Bound. She also performed under the name of Angeliki in dual language productions (Greek/English) based on improvisations about issues that touched the Greek Cypriot community, and the tragedy of the Turkish invasion of Cyprus, Attilas '74. The plays included Dowry with Two White Doves, Afrodite Unbound, A Revolutionary Nicknamed Roosevelt, Ethnikos Aravonas.
 In 1982, she played the lead role in the stage play Medea by Euripides, directed by George Eugeniou at Theatro Technis (Cypriot Community in London).

Rockas performed Lady Macbeth in Shakespeare's Macbeth at the Tramshed Woolwich.

Film and television
On film, Rockas has appeared in secondary roles: the Maintenance Woman in Peter Hyams's Outland, Henrietta in The Witches directed by Nicolas Roeg, and as Nereida in Oh Babylon! directed by Costas Ferris.

In Greece she has played the lead role, Ms Ortiki in Thodoros Maragos's television series Emmones Idees with Vangelis Mourikis as Socratis.

New Theatre 
In November 1980, Rockas set up the performance of 'Tis Pity She's a Whore by John Ford in which she played the lead part of Annabella. She financed the production herself and enlisted the then unknown Declan Donnellan to direct the play to be performed at London's Half Moon Theatre and Theatre Space. The production was designed by Nick Ormerod.

Internationalist Theatre 

In April 1981, Rockas founded Internationalist Theatre to create a multi-racial and multi-national theatre company for actors living in London of any racial or national background, of any accent, performing drama classics as well as contemporary works not especially written for multi-racial and multi-national casts. It was first announced on 9 April 1981 in the Theatre News, page (2), by the editor of The Stage, describing the company's formation "to assert a multi-racial drama policy", with their performance of the revival of The Balcony by Jean Genet.

Internationalist Theatre staged productions by dramatists including Pirandello, Genet, and Tennessee Williams who belong to "the continental, non-realistic, symbolically orientated drama of this century (20th) and..proved most uncongenial to the tunnel visioned repertoire builders" of British theatre of that period.

Archives 

The records of Rockas' work as an actress and founder/artistic director of Internationalist Theatre and correspondence with Joan Littlewood, Athol Fugard, Michael Meyer, George Bizos are held at the British Library under Western Manuscripts.
The digital records of Rockas' work as an actress and theatre practitioner are held by the Scottish Theatre Archive supplemented by Angelique Rockas File: Visual Archive of theatre work, film work, and projects Flickr.
The Angelique Rockas Archive of Correspondence with film directors including: Elia Kazan, Derek Jarman, Lindsay Anderson, Costas Gavras, and with actress Julie Christie about Yugoslavia/Kosovo film project is now held at the British Film Institute BFI and at The National Archives (United Kingdom).
Bertolt-Brecht-Archiv Akademie der Künste Informationen zu Angelique Rockas Gründerin der Theatercompagnie Internationalist Theatre

References

External links 

Angelique Rockas on the British Film Institute website
Angelique Rockas on IMDB

Living people
University of the Witwatersrand alumni
University of Cape Town alumni
Opposition to apartheid in South Africa
British Christians
British film actresses
Debutantes
Greek film actresses
South African actresses
Women theatre managers and producers
Theatre practitioners
20th-century English actresses
21st-century English actresses
Actor-managers
Year of birth missing (living people)
Actresses from London
South African people of Greek descent
People from Boksburg